Eugène Manuel (13 July 18231901), French poet and man of letters.

Life
He was born in Paris, the son of a Jewish doctor.

He was educated at the Ecole Normale, and taught rhetoric for some years in provincial schools and then in Paris. In 1870 he entered the department of public instruction, and in 1878 became inspector-general. 
His works include:
 (1866), which received a prize from the Academy
 (1874)
 (1871)
Patriotic poems, which were forbidden in Alsace-Lorraine by the German authorities
 (1881), poems
 (4 vols, 1854-1858)
A schoolbook written in collaboration with his brother-in-law, Abraham Ernest Lévi Alvarès
 (1870), a drama dealing with social questions, which was crowned by the Academy
 (1873), a comedy
 (1889), and editions of the works of JB Rousseau (1852) and André Chénier (1884). 
He died in Paris in 1901.

His  (2 vols, 1899) contained some fresh poems; to his  (Paris, 1905) is prefixed an introductory note by A Cahen.

References

Attribution:

External links
 
 

1823 births
1901 deaths
19th-century French Jews
19th-century French poets
Jewish poets
École Normale Supérieure alumni
French male poets
19th-century poets
19th-century French male writers
Writers from Paris